This is the list of South Korean girl group (G)I-dle videography. It includes music videos, lyric videos, dance practice videos, music clips and commercial films since its debut in 2018.

Music videos

Korean

Japanese

Lyric videos

Music clips

Live clips

Other videos

Dance practice videos

Commercial films

Others

Photo albums

Calendars

References

External links 
 (G)I-DLE (Official YouTube Channel) on YouTube

G
V